The 2007 AFC Cup was the fourth edition of the AFC Cup, playing between clubs from nations who are members of the Asian Football Confederation.

Qualification
The 13 'developing' nations in the Asian Football Confederation were invited to nominate one or two clubs to participate in the 2007 competition.  2006 winners, Al-Faisaly of Jordan qualify automatically, but proceed to the group stage.

Vietnam and Thailand lose ration for Australia in AFC Champions League. Instead of sending two teams by each country to compete for AFC Champions League, the second representative team of Vietnam and Thailand is demoted to play in AFC Cup.

Bangladesh were excluded, after they were relegated to AFC President's Cup along Turkmenistan.

Champions of North Korea and Myanmar did not participate.

The draw took place in Kuala Lumpur on 22 December, allocating teams into six groups.

Group stage
Key to colors in group tables:
Green: Group winners and Best runners-up advance to the quarter finals.

Group A

Group B

Group C

Group D

Group E

Group F

Best runners-up
Two best runners-up, one from groups A, B and C and one from groups D, E and F, qualify for the quarter finals.

Group A, B, C (West & Central Asia Zone)

Group D, E, F (East, South & South East Asia Zone)

Knockout stage

Quarter-finals

|}

First leg

Second leg

Semi-finals

|}

First leg

Second leg

Final

|}

First leg

Second leg

Statistics

Top goalscorers

See also
AFC Champions League 2007

Footnotes

References

External links
AFC Cup official page

2
2007